Adeeba Riyaz, born in the Anantnag district of Jammu and Kashmir, is an English language poet. She is the youngest author from the Union Territory to publish a book, Zeal of Pen.

Published work
Zeal Of Pen (2021)

References

Living people
Kashmiri literature
Year of birth missing (living people)
People from Anantnag district
21st-century Indian poets
21st-century Indian women writers
Indian women poets